Hussman is a surname. Notable people with the surname include:

John Hussman (born 1962), American academic and stock trader
Walter E. Hussman, Jr. (born 1947), American journalist and newspaper publisher

Institutions
The UNC Hussman School of Journalism and Media, named after the Hussman journalism family

See also
Husmann